Morteza Rezaeian (born 14 June 1989) is an Iranian weightlifter who won a silver medal at the 2010 Guangzhou Asian Games.

Major results

References

External links
 
 

1989 births
Living people
Iranian male weightlifters
Iranian strength athletes
Asian Games silver medalists for Iran
Asian Games medalists in weightlifting
Weightlifters at the 2010 Asian Games
Medalists at the 2010 Asian Games
21st-century Iranian people